NanoDragon is a 3U CubeSat built by the Vietnam National Satellite Center (VNSC). NanoDragon will use its automatic identification system (AIS) receiver to monitor vessels, and will also test the accuracy of its attitude control using an optical imager. It carries an advanced OBC (on board computer) developed by Japan's Meisei Electric.

A project led by the Vietnam National Satellite Center, NanoDragon was manufactured by 36 Vietnamese engineers. It was launched by Epsilon launch vehicle on 9 November 2021 as part of the Innovative Satellite Technology Demonstration-2 mission.

See also 

 PicoDragon
 MicroDragon

References 

Satellites of Japan
Spacecraft launched in 2021
2021 in Japan